= Hovering Acts, Great Britain =

Series of 18th-century anti-smuggling laws in Great Britain

Hovering Acts
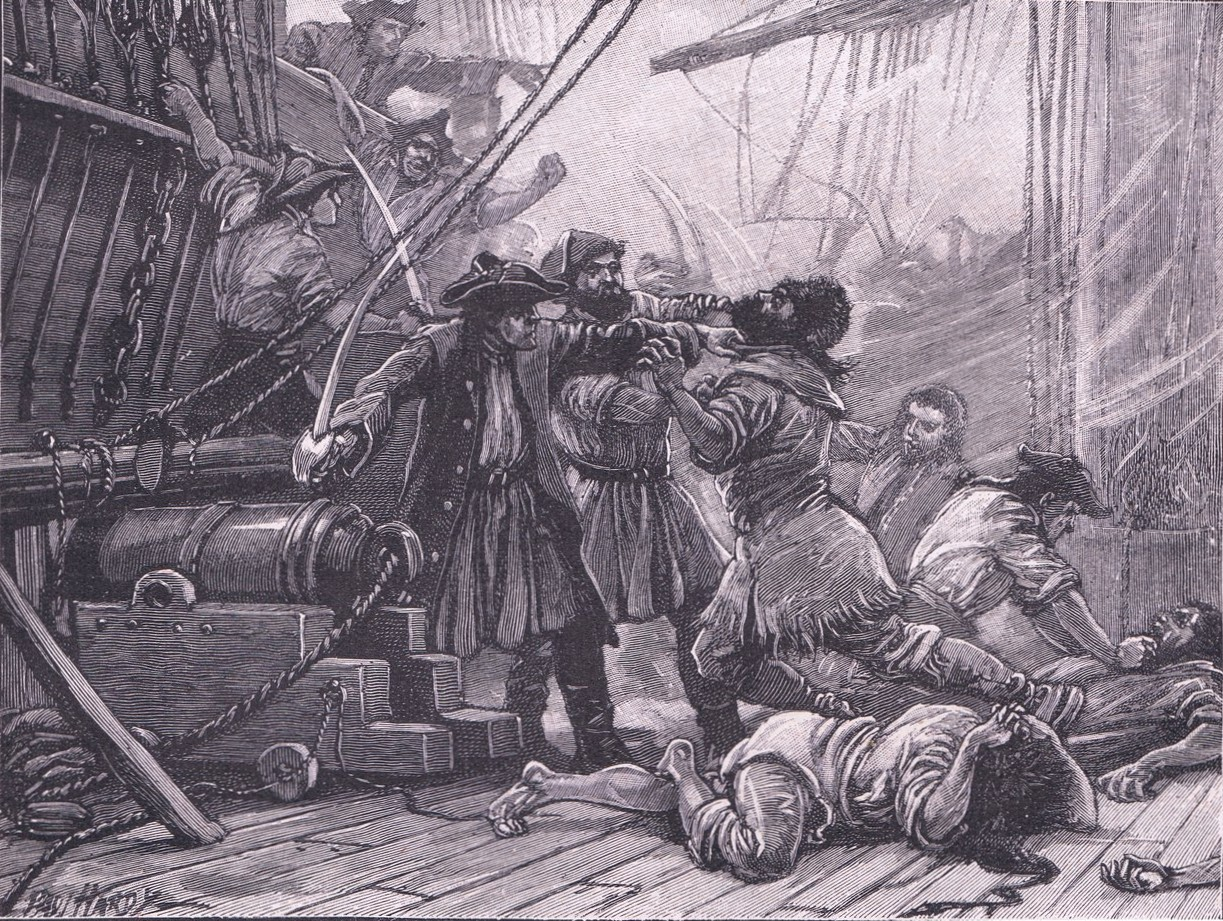
- A British revenue cutter crew boarding a smuggling ship during the Georgian era.

Parliament of Great Britain
- Long title: An act for the more effectual preventing the clandestine running of customs goods.
- Citation: 5 Geo. 1. c. 11
- Territorial extent: Kingdom of Great Britain
- Enacted by: King George I
- Enacted: 1718
- Status: Repealed

The Hovering Acts were a series of anti-smuggling laws imposed during the Georgian era in the Kingdom of Great Britain, against smugglers and smuggling ships avoiding import taxes. The government of the Kingdom of Great Britain put a restriction on boat design; as usage of custom-built, highly fast boats was common to transport illegal goods.

== Key Legislation ==
The first act was passed in 1718 under the reign of King George I. Originally, Britain had stretched their outside border at maximum 3 miles. This meant that any ships that stayed outside of 3 miles, were not allowed to be searched by the government, which is why they stretched it to 12 miles to make it harder for smuggling.
